George Lawrence Bulleid  (25 April 1858 – 1933) was a Victorian watercolourist, born in Glastonbury, Somerset in 1858 and died in 1933.

His father was a local solicitor and Councillor. After working for the family firm, and qualifying as a solicitor in 1881, he started studying art classes in the evenings after work. He first studied at the West London School of Art under the instruction of George Simpson, before moving on to the Heatherley School of Fine Art. His work focused on groups of figures arranged within an architectural structure, contemplative or melancholic individuals.

References

Further reading

 
 

1858 births
1933 deaths
19th-century English painters
20th-century English painters
English male painters
20th-century English male artists
19th-century English male artists